The  is a private railway based in Nagano, Japan. It originally operated three lines, but only the Nagano Line between Nagano — Suzaka — Shinshū-Nakano — Yudanaka remains in service. Nagaden makes a 1.1% investment in Shinano Railway.

Operations
The Nagano Line has frequent local and express services. It is a major route for commuter traffic in Nagano, and also serves as a link for tourists going to the town of Obuse, the hot springs at Yudanaka, and the ski resorts at Shiga Kōgen.

At limited times throughout the year, there are special reserve round-trip trains between Nagano and Obuse several nights a week in which customers are served a local, specially-made bento and drink local alcohol. For example, on select evenings in March and April, local nihonshu. At other seasons, a beer train on the same route is available. In addition, a wine-tasting train from Nagano to Yudanaka or Yudanaka to Nagano is available on select Saturdays throughout the year.

Stations

Rolling stock

 1000 series 4-car EMUs (2 sets)
Ex-Odakyū 10000 series HiSE sets for Limited express "A" (Yukemuri) services. Entered service from 9 December 2006.
 2100 series 3-car EMUs (2 sets)
Ex-JR Narita Express 253 series sets for Snow Monkey limited express services. Entered service from 26 February 2011.
 3000 series 3-car EMUs 
Ex-Tokyo Metro 03 series sets for local services. Introduced in January 2020. Scheduled to replace the existing 3500 & 3600 series in 2020.
 3500 series 2-car EMUs (14 sets) and 3600 series 3-car EMUs (3 sets)
Ex-TRTA 3000 series sets for local services. Introduced in 1993. Scheduled to be removed from service on 19 January 2023.
 8500 series 3-car EMUs (6 sets)
Ex-Tokyu 8500 series sets for local services. Introduced in 2005.

Former rolling stock
 2000 series 3-car EMUs
For Limited express "B" services. (1957–August 2011)
 0 series
For "Officeman & Student" Local services. (1966–2002)
 10 series
For "Officeman & Student" Local services. (1980–2017)

History
The original Nagano Electric Railway was built in 1926, connecting Gondō in Nagano with Suzaka, and electrified at 1,500 V DC. Later that year, the company absorbed the operations of Katō Railway, which operated a line on the east bank of the Chikuma River from Yashiro via Suzaka to Kijima, with the Gongo to Yoshida section being double-tracked. The following year, an additional line was constructed from Shinshū-Nakano to Yudanaka, and in 1928, the line was extended to Nagano Station as dual track.

The Yoshida - Asahi section was double-tracked in 1956, and freight services ceased in 1979. CTC signalling was commissioned between Yudanaka and Asahi in 1980, and extended to Nagano in 1984. The section from Nagano to Zenkōjishita was converted to an underground railway in 1981.

Former connecting lines
 Suzaka Station: The Kato Railway opened a 24 km line to Yashiro on the (now) Shinano Railway Line in 1922, electrified it at 1,500 V DC in January 1926, and merged with the Nagano Electric Railway in September the same year. Due to falling patronage, the line closed on 31 March 2012.
 Shinshū-Nakano Station: The Kato Railway opened the 13 km line to Kijima in 1925 and electrified it at 1,500 V DC the following year. Freight services ceased in 1979 and CTC signalling was commissioned on the line in 1980, but due to falling patronage, the line closed in 2002.

Gallery

See also
 List of railway lines in Japan

References
This article incorporates material from the corresponding article in the Japanese Wikipedia.

External links 

  

 
Railway lines in Japan
Railway
Rail transport in Nagano Prefecture
Companies based in Nagano Prefecture
Railway companies established in 1926